This is a list of films produced by the Tollywood (Bengali language film industry) based in Kolkata in the year 2003.

Highest-grossing
 Sangee

A-Z of films

References

External links
 Tollywood films of 2003 at the Internet Movie Database
 

2003
Lists of 2003 films by country or language
Bengali